was a Japanese author.

He was born in Okayama Prefecture. His son, Junnosuke Yoshiyuki, was also a noted author; his daughter, Kazuko Yoshiyuki, a well-known actress; and his other daughter, Rie Yoshiyuki, was a poet and novelist. The 1997 NHK Asadora Aguri was based on Eisuke's life with his wife Aguri. He also took a role in the Japanese Dada Movement

References

External links 
 e-texts of Eisuke's works at Aozora bunko

Japanese writers
1906 births
1940 deaths